Ginty Vrede (July 18, 1985 – January 28, 2008) was a Dutch kickboxer and 2008 WBC Muaythai Heavyweight World champion.

Biography and career
Vrede won the WBC Muaythai heavyweight World title by beating the previously unbeaten Shane del Rosario in Las Vegas on January 12, 2008, by KO in the first round. Two weeks later, despite being medically tested before his fight in Las Vegas, Vrede died aged 22 from cardiac arrest during a training session in Amsterdam. He was trained by Harry Berepoot who has produced several other World champion fighters in both Muay Thai and Mixed Martial Arts.

Vrede made a habit of knocking out all comers and boasted a high rate, which led to him being compared with K-1 superstar Remy Bonjasky. He was known for his lightning low kicks which he delivered with power, timing and precision. He also had a reputation for hard righthand pin-point punches and powerful knee strikes.

Ginty was on an impromptu training session in the Pancration Sports Centre in Amsterdam when at some point he stated that he did not feel very well, and collapsed moments later. CPR administered for nearly half an hour could not save him. He died on his way to the hospital.

Titles
2008 WBC Muaythai Heavyweight World champion.

Kickboxing record

See also
List of male kickboxers

References

External links
Bear Paw Gym
Ginty Vrede Hyves Website
Ginty Online Memorial 
Ginty Vrede Official Hyves Website

1985 births
2008 deaths
Dutch male kickboxers
Dutch Muay Thai practitioners
Heavyweight kickboxers
People from Heiloo
Sportspeople from Paramaribo
Surinamese emigrants to the Netherlands
Surinamese male kickboxers
Surinamese Muay Thai practitioners
Sportspeople from North Holland